RSG may refer to:

 Radio Sonder Grense, an Afrikaans radio station in South Africa
 RSG Radio, a Serbo-Croatian radio station in Bosnia and Herzegovina
 Randolph Street Gallery, Chicago, Illinois, US
 Regional Seat of Government, UK Cold-War emergency headquarters
 Ready Steady Go!, a 1960s British pop music TV show
 Real Story Group, analyst firm formerly known as CMS Watch
 Red supergiant, a kind of star
 Real Sporting de Gijón, a Spanish football team
 Rabbi Saadia Gaon, 882–942 CE
 RS Group, entertainment & media company in Thailand
 RS Group plc, electronics & industrial distributor in England